Transcription factor GATA-6, also known as GATA-binding factor 6 (GATA6), is protein that in humans is encoded by the GATA6 gene. The gene product preferentially binds (A/T/C)GAT(A/T)(A) of the consensus binding sequence.

Clinical significance 

Mutations in the gene have been linked with pancreatic agenesis and congenital heart defects.

Lung Endodermal Epithelial Development 

GATA-6, a zinc finger transcription factor, is important in the endodermal differentiation of organ tissues. It is also indicated in proper lung development by controlling the late differentiation stages of alveolar epithelium and aquaporin-5 promoter activation. Furthermore, GATA-6 has been linked to the production of LIF, a cytokine that encourages proliferation of endodermal embryonic stem cells and blocks early epiblast differentiation. If left unregulated in the developing embryo, this cytokine production and chemical signal contributes to the phenotypes discussed further below.

Upon the disruption of GATA-6 in an embryo, the distal lung epithelial development is stunted in transgenic mice models The progenitor cells, or stem cells, for alveolar epithelial tissues develop and are specified appropriately, however further differentiation does not occur. Also the distal-proximal bronchiole development is affected, resulting in a reduced quantity of airway exchange sites.

This branching deficit, which will cause bilateral pulmonary hypoplasia after birth, has been locally associated with areas lacking differentiated alveolar epithelium, implicating this phenotype as inherent to endodermal function, and thus may be indirectly linked to improper GATA-6 expression. That is, a deficit of bronchiole branching may not be a result of direct transcriptional error in GATA-6, but rather a side effect of such an error.

See also 
 GATA transcription factor

References

Further reading

External links 
 

Transcription factors